Sisters, or the Balance of Happiness is a 1979 West German drama film written and directed by Margarethe von Trotta.

Cast
Jutta Lampe as Maria Sundermann
Gudrun Gabriel as Anna Sundermann
Jessica Früh as Miriam Grau
Konstantin Wecker as Robert Edelschneider
Agnes Fink as Mutter Sundermann
Heinz Bennent as Münzinger
Rainer Delventhal as Maurice Münzinger
Fritz Lichtenhahn as Fritz
Günther Schütz as Professor
Ilse Bahrs as Blinde Frau
Barbara Sauerbaum as Maria as a Child
Marie-Helena Diekmann as Anna as a Child
Lieselotte Arnold as Frau Eder
Editha Horn as Sister of Blind Woman
Ellen Esser as Nurse Fritz
Heinrich Marmann as Porter
Edith Garden as English language teacher
Kathie Thomsen as Flutist
Volker Schwab as Robert's Colleague

Accolades
In 1980, the film won the Film Award in Gold at the German Film Awards and in 1981 it won the Grand Prix at the Créteil International Women's Film Festival.

References

External links
 
 

1979 films
1979 drama films
German drama films
West German films
1970s German-language films
Films directed by Margarethe von Trotta
Films about sisters
1970s German films